George Washington Bradley (July 13, 1852 – October 2, 1931), nicknamed "Grin", was an American professional baseball player who was a pitcher and infielder. He played for multiple teams in the early years of the National League, the oldest league still active in Major League Baseball (MLB). Bradley is noted for pitching the first no-hitter that is officially recognized by MLB, on July 15, 1876, for the St. Louis Brown Stockings against the Hartford Dark Blues.

Baseball career
Bradley is credited as throwing the first official no-hit, no-run game in major league history. He pitched for the St. Louis Brown Stockings in the club's victory over the Hartford Dark Blues on July 15, 1876. The score ended 2–0 without a hit being allowed by Bradley. That year, he completed 63 of the 64 games for St. Louis, winning 45 and leading the league with a 1.23 earned run average. Additionally, he also threw 16 shutouts, setting a record which has not been broken to date, although was tied in 1916, 40 years later, by Baseball Hall of Fame pitcher Grover Cleveland Alexander.

After 1876, Bradley was not as effective as a pitcher and played mostly other positions after 1879. He was involved in professional baseball for 30 years, 19 of them with the Philadelphia Athletics. In 1883, he was the team's regular third baseman and also went 16–7 on the mound to help the A's win the American Association championship.

In 1887, he served as a player-manager for the Nashville Blues of the Southern League.

Later life
Bradley became a Philadelphia police officer following his baseball career. 

He died at his home in Philadelphia,on October 2, 1931.
 
At the time of his death at age 79, he was retired on a pension from the police department which he had only begun receiving in September 1931. 

Bradley was interred at the Northwood Cemetery in Philadelphia.

See also
List of Major League Baseball no-hitters

References

Philadelphia Public Ledger, Sunday Morning, Oct. 4, 1931, P.6
MacMillan Baseball Encyclopedia Digital Edition (1996)

External links

 George Bradley at SABR (Baseball BioProject)

1852 births
1931 deaths
19th-century baseball players
Baltimore Orioles (AA) players
Baseball player-managers
Baseball players from Pennsylvania
Binghamton Crickets (1880s) players
Buffalo Bisons (minor league) players
Capital City of Albany players
Chicago White Stockings players
Cincinnati Outlaw Reds players
Cleveland Blues (NL) players
Detroit Wolverines players
Easton (minor league baseball) players
Hartford (minor league baseball) players
London Tecumseh players
Major League Baseball pitchers
Major League Baseball third basemen
Nashville Blues players
National League ERA champions
New Bedford (minor league baseball) players
New Haven (minor league baseball) players
New Orleans Pelicans (baseball) players
Sportspeople from Reading, Pennsylvania
Philadelphia Athletics (AA) players
Philadelphia Police Department officers
Providence Grays players
Rochester Hop Bitters players
Rochester Maroons players
Sioux City Corn Huskers players
St. Louis Brown Stockings (NA) players
St. Louis Brown Stockings players
Troy Trojans players
Burials at Northwood Cemetery, Philadelphia